The men's 100 metre backstroke competition of the swimming events at the 1967 Pan American Games took place on 27 July at the Pan Am Pool. The last Pan American Games champion was Ed Bartsch of US.

This race consisted of two lengths of the pool, all in backstroke.

Results
All times are in minutes and seconds.

Heats

Final 
The final was held on July 27.

References

Swimming at the 1967 Pan American Games